Margarita Ortega may refer to:

Margarita Ortega (actress)
Margarita Ortega (magonist)